Andrea Elena Mangiamarchi, known by the stage name Elena Rose (stylised in all caps), is a Venezuelan American singer and songwriter from Miami. She is best known for working with Becky G ("Dollar", "Mejor Así", "Funk Total: Vai Danada", "Muchacha", "My Man", "No Drama" and "Rotate"), as well as musicians such as Rauw Alejandro, Tini and CNCO. In 2020 she released her debut single "Sandunga".

Biography 
Elena Rose was born in Miami to Venezuelan parents. She spent most of her childhood in Puerto Rico and Venezuela, where she studied journalism. Rose has a wide range of musical roots, including Frank Sinatra and Daddy Yankee. She moved to the United States permanently when she was 19. Rose's singing career began when she performed in local bars, and the first artist that Rose worked with was Ricky Martin. Rose's breakthrough song was "Dollar", a single released by singer Becky G and rapper Myke Towers in 2019, which led to her gaining fame as a songwriter. Since then, Rose has worked with many Spanish-language artists, such as Rauw Alejandro, Selena Gomez, TINI, Maluma and CNCO, and helped co-write singles for artists Noriel, Paloma Mami and Emilia Mernes.

In May 2020, Rose released her debut single "Sandunga", a reggaeton-pop song written by her and co-produced by Rose and production team the Honeyboos. She released a follow-up track "Fenomenal" in the same month, which was co-written by her, Peruvian producer Patrick Romantik and Bad Bunny songwriter Brasa.

Discography

Singles

Guest appearances

Songwriting credits

References

Living people
American women singer-songwriters
American Latin pop singers
American people of Venezuelan descent
Hispanic and Latino American musicians
Musicians from Miami
Puerto Rican women composers
21st-century Puerto Rican women singers
Singer-songwriters from Florida
Spanish-language singers of the United States
Venezuelan women singer-songwriters
Women in Latin music
21st-century American women singers
21st-century American singers
1995 births
Hispanic and Latino American women singers
Latin music songwriters